Liu Hui's  algorithm was invented by Liu Hui (fl. 3rd century), a mathematician of the state of Cao Wei. Liu Hui was not satisfied with this value. He commented that it was too large and overshot the mark. Another mathematician Wang Fan (219–257) provided . All these empirical  values were accurate to two digits (i.e. one decimal place). Liu Hui's own calculation with a 96-gon provided an accuracy of five digits: .

Liu Hui remarked in his commentary to The Nine Chapters on the Mathematical Art, that the ratio of the circumference of an inscribed hexagon to the diameter of the circle was three, hence  must be greater than three. He went on to provide a detailed step-by-step description of an iterative algorithm to calculate  to any required accuracy based on bisecting polygons; he calculated  to between 3.141024 and 3.142708 with a 96-gon; he suggested that 3.14 was a good enough approximation, and expressed  as 157/50; he admitted that this number was a bit small. Later he invented a quick method to improve on it, and obtained  with only a 96-gon, a level of accuracy comparable to that from a 1536-gon. His most important contribution in this area was his simple iterative  algorithm.

Area of a circle

Liu Hui argued:

"Multiply one side of a hexagon by the radius (of its circumcircle), then multiply this by three, to yield the area of a dodecagon; if we cut a hexagon into a dodecagon, multiply its side by its radius, then again multiply by six, we get the area of a 24-gon; the finer we cut, the smaller the loss with respect to the area of circle, thus with further cut after cut, the area of the resulting polygon will coincide and become one with the circle; there will be no loss".

Apparently Liu Hui had already mastered the concept of the limit
  

Further, Liu Hui proved that the area of a circle is half of its circumference multiplied by its radius. He said:

"Between a polygon and a circle, there is excess radius. Multiply the excess radius by a side of the polygon. The resulting area exceeds the boundary of the circle".

In the diagram  = excess radius. Multiplying  by one side results in oblong  which exceeds the boundary of the circle. If a side of the polygon is small (i.e. there is a very large number of sides), then the excess radius will be small, hence excess area will be small.

"Multiply the side of a polygon by its radius, and the area doubles; hence multiply half the circumference by the radius to yield the area of circle".

When , half the circumference of the -gon approaches a semicircle, thus half a circumference of a circle multiplied by its radius equals the area of the circle. Liu Hui did not explain in detail this deduction. However, it is self-evident by using Liu Hui's "in-out complement principle" which he provided elsewhere in The Nine Chapters on the Mathematical Art: Cut up a geometric shape into parts, rearrange the parts to form another shape, the area of the two shapes will be identical.

Thus rearranging the six green triangles, three blue triangles and three red triangles into a rectangle with width = 3, and height  shows that the area of the dodecagon = 3.

In general, multiplying half of the circumference of a -gon by its radius yields the area of a 2-gon. Liu Hui used this result repetitively in his  algorithm.

Liu Hui's  inequality

Therefore, the green area represents the difference between the areas of the 2-gon and the N-gon:

The red area is equal to the green area, and so is also . So

Yellow area + green area + red area = 

Let  represent the area of the circle. Then

If the radius of the circle is taken to be 1, then we have Liu Hui's  inequality:

Iterative algorithm

Liu Hui began with an inscribed hexagon. Let  be the length of one side  of hexagon,  is the radius of circle.

Bisect  with line ,  becomes one side of dodecagon (12-gon), let its length be .  Let the length of  be  and the length of  be .

,  are two right angle triangles. Liu Hui used the Pythagorean theorem repetitively:

 
 
 
 
 
 
 

Starting with a hexagon, Liu Hui could determine the side length of a dodecagon using this formula. Then continue repetitively to determine the side length of an icositetragon given the side length of a dodecagon. He could do this recursively as many times as necessary. Knowing how to determine the area of these polygons, Liu Hui could then approximate .

With  units, he obtained

 area of 96-gon  
 area of 192-gon  
 Difference of 96-gon and 48-gon:

from Liu Hui's  inequality:

Since  = 10, 
therefore:

He never took  as the average of the lower limit 3.141024 and upper limit 3.142704.

Liu Hui carried out his calculation with rod calculus, and expressed his results with fractions. However, the iterative nature of Liu Hui's  algorithm is quite clear:

 

The same calculation is done repeatedly, each step requiring only one addition and one square root extraction.

Quick method 
Calculation of square roots of irrational numbers was not an easy task in the third century with
counting rods. Liu Hui discovered a shortcut by comparing the area differentials of polygons, and found that the proportion of the difference in area of successive order polygons was approximately 1/4.

Let  denote the difference in areas of -gon and (/2)-gon

 

He found:

 

Hence:

Area of unit radius circle =

 

In which

 

That is all the subsequent excess areas add up amount to one third of the 

 area of unit circle

Liu Hui was quite happy with this result because he had acquired the same result with the calculation for a 1536-gon, obtaining the area of a 3072-gon. This explains four questions:

 Why he stopped short at 192 in his presentation of his algorithm. After all calculation of square roots was not a simple task with rod calculus. With the quick method, he only needed to perform one more subtraction, one more division (by 3) and one more addition, instead of four more square root extractions.
 Why he preferred to calculate  through calculation of areas instead of circumferences of successive polygons, because the quick method required information about the difference in areas of successive polygons.
 Who was the true author of the paragraph containing calculation of 
 That famous paragraph began with "A Han dynasty bronze container in the military warehouse of Jin dynasty....". Many scholars, among them  Yoshio Mikami and Joseph Needham, believed that the "Han dynasty bronze container" paragraph was the work of Liu Hui and not Zu Chongzhi as other believed, because of the strong correlation of the two methods through area calculation, and because there was not a single word  mentioning  Zu's 3.1415926 <  < 3.1415927  result obtained through 12288-gon.

Later developments
Zu Chongzhi was familiar with Liu Hui's work, and obtained greater accuracy by applying his algorithm to a 12288-gon.

From Liu Hui's formula for 2-gon:

For 12288-gon inscribed in a unit radius circle:
.

From Liu Hui's  inequality:

In which 
.
Therefore

Truncated to eight significant digits:
.
That was the famous Zu Chongzhi  inequality.

Zu Chongzhi then used the interpolation formula by He Chengtian (何承天, 370-447) and obtained an approximating fraction: .

However, this  value disappeared in Chinese history for a long period of time (e.g. Song dynasty mathematician Qin Jiushao used  =  and  ), until Yuan dynasty mathematician Zhao Yuqin worked on a variation of Liu Hui's  algorithm, by bisecting an inscribed square and obtained again

Significance of Liu Hui's algorithm
Liu Hui's  algorithm was one of his most important contributions to ancient Chinese mathematics. It was based on calculation of -gon area, in contrast to the Archimedean algorithm based on polygon circumference.

See also 
 Method of exhaustion (5th century BC)
 Zhao Youqin's π algorithm (13-14th century)
 Proof of Newton's Formula for Pi (17th century)

Notes

 Correct value: 0.2502009052
 Correct values:

Liu Hui's quick method was potentially able to deliver almost the same result of 12288-gon (3.141592516588) with only 96-gon.

References

Further reading 
Needham, Joseph (1986). Science and Civilization in China: Volume 3, Mathematics and the Sciences of the Heavens and the Earth. Taipei: Caves Books, Ltd.
 Wu Wenjun ed, History of Chinese Mathematics Vol III (in Chinese) 

Pi algorithms
Chinese mathematics
Cao Wei